Kavita Oberoi  (born 27 April 1970) is a British entrepreneur. She founded Oberoi Consulting, an IT and Business Healthcare Consultancy in 2001.

Oberoi is also known for her appearances on the Channel 4 TV series The Secret Millionaire and the BBC's The Apprentice: You’re Fired.

Early life

Oberoi is of Indian descent. She grew up above her father's plumbing and bathroom shop in Bradford.

Education 
She left university with a First Class BSc (Hons) Degree in Applied Chemistry from the University of Huddersfield, and embarked on a career as a medical representative with Bayer Pharmaceuticals.

Career 
Deciding to set up her own business, she spotted a business opportunity, providing clinical audit and IT training and business consulting for GP practices, and she quickly won a contract with International Blue Chip Pharmaceutical company, Pfizer. By August 2001, demand for her services had become so great that she established Oberoi Consulting.

In August 2008 when she appeared on Channel 4's hit show The Secret Millionaire.

2001 to present

Oberoi Consulting now has clients such as GP practices, PBC clusters, private healthcare providers, PCTs, pharmacy groups and the pharmaceutical industry, providing healthcare solutions, clinical systems training and clinical audits.

Independently, she also gives motivational speeches and seminars, primarily to the business community.

Her other business interests include commercial property, and the provision of conference facilities and serviced offices, and in January 2010 Oberoi acquired a stake in the global, award-winning security company – Octavian, from which she exited in January 2013.

At the start of 2012, Oberoi joined the "ITV News Business Club"; a national project to track 100 businesses throughout the UK, and for the panelists to discuss events and policies effecting businesses in general.

On 6 December 2012, Oberoi launched the Oberoi Business Hub, a new venture to try to support new and growing businesses, by providing premises and a business support network.

Honours and philanthropy

In 2005, Oberoi was awarded the NRI Pride of India Gold Award and received a special commendation in the Entrepreneur of the Year Section in the Asian Woman of Achievement Awards. Kavita was then given a Fellowship of the RSA (The Royal Society for the encouragement of Arts Manufacture and Commerce).
In 2007 the NRI presented Oberoi with the NRI Achiever Pinnacle Award in the category of Business Empress which recognises single minded dedication and hard work in pursuit of one's goals.
In 2009 Kavita was named in the HBOS report as one of "Britain’s 100 Most Entrepreneurial Women". She was also short-listed for the business and commerce award in the Lloyds Bank Jewel Awards and was a judge and mentor for the HBOS Social Entrepreneur Awards.

Oberoi is now a director of one of the charities, Martha's Oasis, that she supported on Channel 4's Secret Millionaire.

In April 2010 Oberoi was appointed chair of the Global Girls' Fund Board.

In July 2013 Oberoi was awarded a Degree of Honorary Doctor of the University of Huddersfield for Business and Entrepreneurship. In September 2013 Kavita Oberoi was awarded with an Honorary Fellowship Award by Burton and South Derbyshire College for her ongoing Patronage of BSDC and continued support in the employability skills development of BSDC learners.

Kavita Oberoi became an Officer of the Order of the British Empire (OBE), in the Queen's 2014 Birthday Honours List, for services to entrepreneurship and start-up businesses.

References

External links 

 

1970 births
Living people
Businesspeople from Bradford
Alumni of the University of Huddersfield
Officers of the Order of the British Empire
English people of Indian descent